"Unforgettable" is a song by American rock band Godsmack. It was the fourth single off of their seventh studio album When Legends Rise.

Writing
According to Sully Erna, "Unforgettable" was the last song written for the album and it took the band less than three days to write and to come up with the melody, stating "It was one of those moments where this really big riff came into my head, and I'm thinking, 'is this something we already do, or is this something new just knocking on my brain?' I worked it out, and the melodies and everything just came very quickly."

Recording
During the recording process of "Unforgettable", Godsmack recruited 20 students from Gilbert H. Hood and West Running Brook middle schools in Derry, New Hampshire to provide vocals on the song's chorus. Sully Erna credited Community Alliance for Teen Safety (C.A.T.S.), a non-profit organization working to promote youth safety in Derry and the surrounding communities, for making the students' appearance on the song possible. Erna expressed his satisfaction with how the song turned out, calling it "unique" and "super catchy" while acknowledging it's "different" compared to other songs on the record.

Track listing
Digital single

Music video

The music video for the single, released on April 8, 2020, was directed by Noah Berlow and produced by Gautam Singhani and took two years to produce. Godsmack invited more than 400 aspiring musicians from middle school students across New England to take part in the video, teaching them the song and aspects of the music business. The video was filmed at the SNHU Arena in Manchester, New Hampshire, with all the students taking part in a performance of the song. On the band's decision to feature the group of music students in the music video, Sully Erna, who can be seen giving an inspirational speech to the group of students toward the beginning of the video, explained:

Erna concluded by saying "This was a fun project for [the kids], but it was also something that was really important to them. They had a voice in this video." Bassist Robbie Merrill shared Erna's sentiments, calling the opportunity "exciting" and emphasizing "It's a memory that they're going to have for the rest of their life."

Documentary
On June 18, the band produced and released a six-minute mini-documentary on the making of the music video. Referring to the latter as "one of Godsmack's proudest and most humbling #1 moments in their career," the documentary takes viewers behind the scenes as the band and students interacted and recorded the music video together.

Live performance 
Godsmack debuted "Unforgettable" live on April 27, 2018, at the Welcome to Rockville 2018 rock festival in Jacksonville, Florida. In an interview with drummer Shannon Larkin, he admitted to the band's use of pre-recorded vocals while performing the song live:

Prior to that interview, however, the same students who appeared on the song were invited to perform the song live on stage with the band at their show in Gilford, New Hampshire on August 22, 2018, at the Bank of New Hampshire Pavilion.

Reception

Critical
Reviews for "Unforgettable" were positive. Loudwire's Chad Childers called the song a "head-bobbing rocker." AllMusic's reviewer Neil Yeung described the song as a "massive anthem" Malcolm Dome of Classic Rock praised the song for being based on a "finely honed" melody which plays to Sully Erna's vocal advantage.

Commercial
Upon its release, "Unforgettable" entered multiple charts, including the Billboard Mainstream Rock. Like the previous three singles from the album, the song peaked at number one where it remained for five consecutive weeks, giving Godsmack their eleventh number one single on that chart. This makes Godsmack one of only four rock acts to score four number one singles from the same album. When asked about that milestone, Sully Erna commented that the band had a good feeling about the song but were still pleasantly surprised to see it reach number one nonetheless. He concluded by saying that he was mostly happy for the students who participated in recording the song, calling them "the voice of this song" and "the true hidden heroes behind it."

Personnel

Godsmack
 Sully Erna – vocals, rhythm guitar, producer
 Tony Rombola – lead guitar
 Robbie Merrill – bass
 Shannon Larkin – drums

Additional personnel
 The Gilbert H. Hood and West Running Brook Choir - additional vocals

Charts

Weekly charts

Year-end charts

External links 
 Behind the Scenes with Godsmack’s Unforgettable

References 

2020 singles
2018 songs
Godsmack songs
Songs written by Sully Erna